Timothy Chandler (born March 29, 1990) is a professional soccer player who plays as a right-back for Bundesliga club Eintracht Frankfurt. Born in Germany, he represents the United States national team.

Early life and education
Chandler was born in Frankfurt, West Germany to an African American father who served in the U.S. military, and a German mother. His father and mother separated shortly after his birth. He continued to live with his mother in Germany.

Club career

1. FC Nürnberg

Chandler began his career at Sportfreunde Oberau as well as time with Eintracht Frankfurt before transferring to 1. FC Nürnberg in the summer of 2010. He made his debut for the first team of 1. FC Nürnberg on January 15, 2011 against Borussia Mönchengladbach. On February 12, 2011, he scored the first goal of his professional career against VfB Stuttgart.

Chandler made his first appearance of the 2011–12 season on July 30, 2011, providing an assist for Markus Feulner's equalizing goal in an eventual 5–1 triumph over Arminia Bielefeld in the first round of the DFB-Pokal.  Chandler's debut appearance of the year's Bundesliga campaign came a week later on August 6, playing the full ninety minutes of a narrow 1–0 defeat of Hertha BSC.  Chandler netted his only goal of the campaign on November 26 against FC Kaiserslautern, blasting the ball in from the edge of the area, securing a 1–0 win and the club's first victory in eight games.  Two weeks later on December 10, the referee adjudged Chandler's challenge on Sejad Salihović as too strong and the American was given a red card; down to ten man, Nürnberg fell to a 2–0 loss with both goals coming from Vedad Ibišević.  Things turned worse for Chandler and Nürnberg two days later, as the defender was at fault for conceding the only goal of the game against SpVgg Greuther Fürth in the third round of the DFB-Pokal, eliminating his side from the competition.

In Nürnberg's 4–1 win over Schalke on April 11, 2012, Chandler provided his second assist of the season, finding midfielder Daniel Didavi who made it 3–0.  Chandler made his 30th, 29 of which were starts, and final appearance of the Bundesliga season on April 28 in Nürnberg's 3–2 defeat of Hoffenheim, taking revenge for his red card and the club's loss earlier in the season.  Nürnberg finished the season in a respectable tenth place in the Bundesliga and Chandler attracted interest from many clubs, including VfB Stuttgart.  However, Chandler decided to reject the overtures from other German clubs and signed a contract extension with Nürnberg, tying him to the club until July 2015.

Chandler's first appearance in the 2012–13 season came in Nürnberg's humbling 3–2 defeat to fifth division side TSV Havelse in the first round of the DFB-Pokal on August 19, 2012.  His only goal of the campaign came against Hannover 96 on September 26, scoring a consolation goal as his side fell to a 4–1 defeat.  Chandler again made 30 Bundesliga appearances, 29 from the start, as Nürnberg finished the league in tenth position on 44 points.

Eintracht Frankfurt

After Nürnberg were relegated at the end of the 2013–14 Bundesliga season, Chandler signed a three-year contract with his former club Eintracht Frankfurt on June 3, 2014.

International career
In March 2011, Chandler was selected by Bob Bradley as part of the United States's 24-man squad set to face Paraguay and Argentina in international friendlies. Chandler made his debut with the U.S. on March 26, 2011, playing the entire second half of a 1–1 draw against Argentina. On May 16, 2012, Timothy Chandler declined an offer from U.S. coach Jürgen Klinsmann to join his training camp for the upcoming friendlies and 2014 World Cup Qualifiers. Klinsmann stated that Timothy expressed a need to take a break from the U.S. and find his international identity. However, Chandler later accepted a call-up for the U.S. friendly against Russia, stating that he was "in 1,000 percent."  On February 4, 2013, Jürgen Klinsmann named Chandler to the United States' 24-man roster for February 6, 2013 match at Honduras; his start against Honduras on February 6, 2013 "cap-tied" Chandler to the United States for all future international competitions, under FIFA rules.

Chandler did not feature for the United States until 15 months later when he was recalled by Klinsmann as part of the 30-man squad in preparation for the 2014 FIFA World Cup. He was then selected to the final 23-man roster on May 22, 2014 for the finals in Brazil. Though he was on the final roster that went to Brazil, Chandler did not see any game action.

Chandler was again called up for the 2015 CONCACAF Gold Cup and started at right back in the opening game against Honduras.

Career statistics

Club

International
Scores and results list the United States's goal tally first.

|-
| 1. || July 3, 2015 || Nissan Stadium, Nashville, United States ||  ||  ||  || Friendly || 
|}

Honors
Eintracht Frankfurt
DFB-Pokal: 2017–18
UEFA Europa League: 2021–22

References

External links
 
 Profile at the official 1. FC Nürnberg website 
 
 
 Interview at the official USSF website

1990 births
Living people
German people of African-American descent
Citizens of the United States through descent
German emigrants to the United States
Footballers from Frankfurt
African-American soccer players
German footballers
American soccer players
Association football fullbacks
Eintracht Frankfurt II players
1. FC Nürnberg II players
1. FC Nürnberg players
Eintracht Frankfurt players
UEFA Europa League winning players
Bundesliga players
United States men's international soccer players
2014 FIFA World Cup players
2015 CONCACAF Gold Cup players
21st-century African-American sportspeople